Marius Kazlauskas (born 1 May 1984, in Gargždai) is a Lithuanian football defender who currently plays for Atlantas Klaipėda.

External links
Turan Tovuz PFC

References

1984 births
Living people
Lithuanian footballers
FK Žalgiris players
FC Dynamo Moscow reserves players
Association football defenders
FC DAC 1904 Dunajská Streda players
Slovak Super Liga players
Expatriate footballers in Russia
Expatriate footballers in Slovakia
Expatriate footballers in Azerbaijan
Lithuanian expatriate sportspeople in Russia
Lithuanian expatriate sportspeople in Slovakia
Lithuanian expatriate sportspeople in Azerbaijan
People from Gargždai